This article is about the list of Atlético Petróleos de Luanda players.  Atlético Petróleos de Luanda is an Angolan football (soccer) club based in Luanda, Angola and plays at Estádio 11 de Novembro.  The club was established in 1982.

2020–2021
Atlético Petróleos de Luanda players 2020–2021

2011–2021
Atlético Petróleos de Luanda players 2011–2021

2001–2010
Atlético Petróleos de Luanda players 2001–2010

1991–2000
Atlético Petróleos de Luanda players 1991–2000

1981–1990
Atlético Petróleos de Luanda players 1981–1990

Notes

External links
 PetroLuanda.co.ao Official club website 
 Girabola.com profile
 Zerozero.pt profile
 Facebook profile

References

Atletico
Atlético Petróleos de Luanda players
Association football player non-biographical articles